Barcelona Cómica was a satirical Spanish language magazine published between 1889 and 1900. The magazine covered satirical work.

References

External links
Archived issues at the Spanish National Library

Defunct magazines published in Spain
Magazines established in 1889
Magazines disestablished in 1900
Magazines published in Barcelona
Spanish-language magazines
Satirical magazines published in Spain